Nogometni klub Šoštanj, commonly referred to as NK Šoštanj or simply Šoštanj, is a Slovenian football club from Šoštanj which plays in the MNZ Celje's Intercommunal League. The club was founded in 1920.

Honours
Slovenian Third League
 2003–04

Slovenian Fourth Division
 1995–96, 1996–97MNZ Celje Cup'''
 1997–98

League history since 1991

References

External links	
Official website 

Association football clubs established in 1920
Football clubs in Slovenia
1920 establishments in Slovenia